Richard Doyle may refer to:

Richard Doyle (actor) (born 1945), American actor
Richard Doyle (author) (born 1948), British thriller writer
Richard Doyle, the first All-American in Michigan Wolverines men's basketball history
Richard Doyle (illustrator) (1824–1883), English illustrator 
Richard Doyle (sailor) (died 1807), U.S. Navy sailor who fought during the Barbary Wars
Richard Doyle (politician) (1923–2003), Canadian senator, 1985–1998, journalist and author
Dick Doyle (Wexford hurler) (1879–1946), Irish hurler
Dick Doyle (Kilkenny hurler) (1888–1959), Irish hurler
Dick Doyle (American football) (1930–2003), American football defensive back